Joseph ("Joey") Wells (born December 22, 1965) is a retired male long jumper from the Bahamas, best known for finishing sixth at the 1984 Olympic Games.

Achievements

References

1965 births
Living people
Bahamian male long jumpers
Athletes (track and field) at the 1984 Summer Olympics
Olympic athletes of the Bahamas